Raymond Anthony Coulthard (born 3 September 1968) is a British actor. He is best known for portraying Alasdair Sinclair in Emmerdale and restaurant manager James Schofield in Hotel Babylon.

Career
Coulthard's television appearances include several costume dramas. He played Frank Churchill in the 1996 television adaptation of Jane Austen's novel Emma, Mr Glascock in the 2004 adaptation of He Knew He Was Right, and Miles Edgerton in Mr. Selfridge. In 2005, he appeared in the first series of Extras. He also appeared in the second series of Love Soup, and played Matt Strong in the TV series Casualty during 2010.

Coulthard's film roles include The English Patient, The Best Man, and The Muppet Christmas Carol (in which he played a young Ebenezer Scrooge). He also voiced one of the main characters in the BBC Radio 4 Extra sitcom The Brothers.

Coulthard has acted in many stage productions, especially Shakespeare plays, including work for the Royal National Theatre and the Donmar Warehouse. From 2011 to 2012, he played Duke Vincentio in Measure for Measure and Bishop Santa Cruz in Helen Edmundson's play The Heresy of Love for the Royal Shakespeare Company. He portrayed Lord Egerton in the second series of Mr Selfridge.

In spring 2015, he starred as King George VI alongside Jason Donovan as Lionel Louge in the Chichester Festival Theatre and Birmingham Repertory Theatre production of The King's Speech before touring the UK.

In January 2017 he returned to the Birmingham Repertory Theatre to star in the French comedy What's in a Name? alongside Nigel Harman, Sarah Hadland, Jamie Glover and Olivia Poulet.

Filmography

Film

Television

References

External links

1968 births
Living people
English male television actors
Actors from Chester
Male actors from Cheshire
English male film actors
English male stage actors
20th-century English male actors
21st-century English male actors